The Romanian Popular Party (PPR), previously known as the Liberal Reformist Party, is a political party from Moldova. The party supportes the unification of Romania and Moldova. On 27 August 2019, the party changed its name from Liberal Reformist Party to Romanian Popular Party and elected Vlad Țurcanu as its new president at the second Congress of the party.

Overview 

Formed on 12 April 2013, as the Liberal Party Reform Council (CRPL) and a pro-government faction within the Liberal Party (PL), calling for reform of the party. The first president of the party was Ion Hadârcă from 2013 until 2019. Its seven MPs were subsequently ejected from the Liberal Party and agreed to enter a new coalition, called the Pro-European Coalition, with the Liberal Democratic Party of Moldova (PLDM) and the Democratic Party of Moldova (PDM) on 30 May 2013.

On 21 June 2013, at Costești, Ialoveni took place General Meeting of the Liberal Party Reform Council, which adopted a decision to create a new political party with a liberal doctrine.

On 1 August 2013, in Chişinău took place the first meeting of the Council of Founding of the Liberal Reformist Party (PLR).

Its seven MPs were former Liberal Party (PL) deputy chairman Ion Hadârcă, former Liberal Party secretary-general Oleg Bodrug, Ana Guțu, Anatol Arhire, Vadim Vacarciuc, Vadim Cojocaru, and Valeriu Saharneanu. The party failed to gain representation at the 2014 parliamentary election.

Vlad Țurcanu has been the president of the party since 27 August 2019.

The PPR is one of the founding members of Mișcarea Politică Unirea (MPU), a political party established for the unification of Romania and Moldova.

Notable former members 

 Ion Hadârcă 
 Oleg Bodrug 
 Ana Guțu
 Anatol Arhire
 Vadim Vacarciuc
 Valeriu Saharneanu
 Vadim Cojocaru

Electoral results

Legislative elections

Footnotes

External links
 Liberal Party Reform Council official website

2013 establishments in Moldova
Conservative parties in Moldova
Liberal parties in Moldova
Political parties established in 2013
Pro-European political parties in Moldova
Romanian nationalism in Moldova